Ranapur is a town and a nagar panchayat in Jhabua district in the Indian state of Madhya Pradesh.

Geography
It has an average elevation of 370 metres (1,213 feet).

Demographics
 India census, Ranapur had a population of 11,617. Males constitute 52% of the population and females 6,245 and at present is 48%. Ranapur has an average literacy rate of 62%, higher than the national average of 59.5%: male literacy is 71%, and female literacy is 53%. In Ranapur, 16% of the population is under 6 years of age.

References

Cities and towns in Jhabua district
Jhabua